"Wish Bank" is the second segment of the fourth episode from the first season (1985–1986) of the television series The Twilight Zone. In this segment, upon finding a genie's lamp at a garage sale, a woman tries to cash in three wishes at the Department of Magical Venues, a satire of the department of motor vehicles.

Plot
Visiting a garage sale, Mary Ellen and Janice Hamill stumble upon a golden lamp that is engraved: "Rub me and your wish will come true. Certain restrictions may apply." When Janice rubs the lamp, she is transported to the Department of Magical Venues, a bank-like room where a broker types up her three wishes: $10,000,000, to look 10 years younger, and for her ex-husband Craig to suffer moderate sexual dysfunction for 18 months. Her broker gives her a stack of papers to sign and tells her that she will have to pay taxes on the wishes. Then he directs her to stand in a long line at the validation window to get her wishes approved.

After finally getting to the front of the line, Janice is told that she is missing a form and is directed back to her broker only to find a supervisor has just fired him for an error he committed. He then tells her that it is quitting time and everyone but Janice disappears. Frustrated, Janice wishes she had never found the lamp in the first place and is transported back to the garage sale. It is moments before she found the lamp, but this time she leaves for a sale at Fashion Square.

Production
The black hats the employees wear as they prepare to leave are painted energy domes, and the raised "DEVO" lettering can be seen when one falls off an actor's head.

External links
 

1985 American television episodes
The Twilight Zone (1985 TV series season 1) episodes

fr:La Banque des vœux